Issaquena County is a county located in the U.S. state of Mississippi. As of the 2020 Census, its population was 1,338, making it the least populous county in the United States east of the Mississippi River. Its county seat is Mayersville. With a per-capita income of $18,598, Issaquena County is, by that measure, one of the poorest counties in the United States.

Issaquena County is located in the Mississippi Delta region. The Mississippi River flows along the entire western boundary of the county, and many of the earliest communities were river ports.

The county's economy is chiefly based on agriculture, though a number of hunting camps are also located here and contribute to the economy. Mississippi's two most recent records for the heaviest alligator taken by a hunter have both been in Issaquena County, the latest in 2012 when a   alligator was killed at a camp near Fitler.

History 
"Issaquena" (isi okhina) is a Choctaw word meaning "Deer River"; it is the Indian name for Deer Creek.  The Choctaw people were the first inhabitants of the county, and were removed from their land in 1820.  Non-Native settlers began arriving in the early 1830s.

Issaquena county was established on January 23, 1844, from the southern portion of Washington County.  The first county seat was located in Skipwith, and then moved to Duncansby (both communities are now ghost towns). In 1848, the county seat moved to Tallula, and in 1871, to Mayersville.

The county lies entirely in the Mississippi Alluvial Plain, and hardwood forest known as "bottomland" grows thick in the 
nutrient-rich, high-clay "buckshot" soil. About that same time, the Louisville, New Orleans and Texas Railway was completed along a north–south route through the center of the county.

In 1876, Sharkey County was created from portions of Issaquena, Warren, and Washington counties.

Slavery 
In 1860, 92.5% of Issaquena County's total population were enslaved people, the highest concentration anywhere in the United States.  The U.S. Census for that year showed that 7,244 slaves were held in Issaquena County, and of 115 slave owners, 39 held 77 or more slaves.  Stephen Duncan of Issaquena County held 858 slaves, second only to Joshua John Ward of South Carolina.  This large "value of slave property" made Issaquena County the second richest county in the United States, with "mean total wealth per freeman" at $26,800 in 1860.  By 1880—just 15 years after the abolition of slavery—the county had developed "a strong year-round market for wage labor", and Issaquena was the only county in Mississippi to report "no sharecropping or sharerenting whatsoever".

Civil War 

During the winter of 1862 and spring of 1863, Union Army General Ulysses S. Grant conducted a series of amphibious operations aimed at capturing the Confederate stronghold of Vicksburg, located south of Issaquena County.

The Steele's Bayou Expedition occurred on waterways within Issaquena County, including Steele Bayou, Little Sunflower River, Big Sunflower River, Deer Creek, Black Bayou, Little Black Bayou, and the Yazoo River.

The shallow waterways proved difficult for the large Union boats, and Confederate defenses were robust.  The Steele's Bayou Expedition was a defeat for Union forces in Issaquena County.

Geography 

Major highways 
  U.S. Route 61
  Mississippi Highway 1
  Mississippi Highway 14
  Mississippi Highway 16

Adjacent counties 
 Washington County (north)
 Sharkey County (northeast)
 Yazoo County (east)
 Warren County (south)
 East Carroll Parish, Louisiana (west)
 Chicot County, Arkansas (northwest)

Demographics

2020 United States Census 

As of the 2020 United States Census, there were 1,338 people, 483 households, and 274 families residing in the county.

2010 United States Census 
As of the 2010 United States Census, there were 1,406 people living in the county. 64.4% were Black or African American, 34.6% White, 0.4% Asian, 0.2% Native American, 0.1% of some other race and 0.2% of two or more races. 0.6% were Hispanic or Latino (of any race).

2000 United States Census 
As of the census of 2000, there were 2,274 people, 726 households, and 509 families living in the county.  The population density was 5.15 people per square mile (2/km2).  There were 877 housing units at an average density of 2 per square mile (1/km2).  The racial makeup of the county was 36.32% White, 62.75% Black or African American, 0.09% Native American, 0.22% from other races, and 0.62% from two or more races.  0.44% of the population were Hispanic or Latino of any race.

There were 726 households, out of which 34.20% had children under the age of 18 living with them, 45.60% were married couples living together, 16.00% had a female householder with no husband present, and 29.80% were non-families. 26.20% of all households were made up of individuals, and 12.30% had someone living alone who was 65 years of age or older.  The average household size was 2.77 and the average family size was 3.37.

In the county, the population was spread out, with 27.70% under the age of 18, 10.90% from 18 to 24, 30.90% from 25 to 44, 19.90% from 45 to 64, and 10.70% who were 65 years of age or older.  The median age was 33 years. For every 100 females there were 113.50 males.  For every 100 females age 18 and over, there were 130.10 males.

The median income for a household in the county was $19,936, and the median income for a family was $23,913. Males had a median income of $23,167 versus $17,115 for females. The per capita income for the county was $10,581.  About 25.90% of families and 33.20% of the population were below the poverty line, including 43.20% of those under age 18 and 41.00% of those age 65 or over.

Issaquena County has the second lowest per capita income in Mississippi and the 36th lowest in the United States.

Poverty and unemployment
Of 3,197 counties ranked by the U.S. Census Bureau in 2011 for "estimated percent of people of all ages in poverty", Issaquena was 14th; for those under age 18, the county was eighth.  It was estimated that 40.1 percent of the county's residents lived in poverty.

In 2014, Issaquena County had the highest percentage of unemployed people in Mississippi, and the fifth highest of any county in the United States, at 18.4 percent.

Government and politics 
The county is considered to lean Democratic, voting for Barack Obama in both 2008 and 2012. However, the county voted for Republican senator Thad Cochran's reelection bid in 2014. and Donald Trump came within 50 votes of winning the county in 2020,

In the 2019 statewide elections, Issaquena voted Democratic for Governor, Secretary of State, and Attorney General, and Republican for Lieutenant Governor, Treasurer, Insurance Commissioner, and Agriculture Commissioner.

Education 
There are no schools located in Issaquena County. Students attend campuses in neighboring Sharkey and Washington counties.
 Public School Districts
 South Delta School District – Based in Rolling Fork; Serves most of Issaquena County including Mayersville. Operates South Delta High School.
 Western Line School District – Based in Avon; Serves northwestern portion of Issaquena County.
 Private Schools
 Sharkey-Issaquena Academy – Located in Rolling Fork; Enrollment open to Issaquena County residents.

In the segregation era (before around 1970) the county only had schools for black students.

Communities

Town 
 Mayersville

Census-designated places 
 Grace
 Valley Park

Unincorporated communities 
 Chotard
 Fitler
 Tallula

Ghost towns 
 Arcadia
 Baleshed
 Ben Lomond
 Duncansby
 Magna Vista
 Shiloh

Notable people 

 Unita Blackwell, civil rights leader and mayor of Mayersville from 1976 to 2001; first female African-American mayor in Mississippi.
 Charles C. Diggs, Sr., first African-American Democrat elected to the Michigan Senate; born in Tallula.
 William Stamps Farish II, president of Standard Oil; born in Mayersville.
 Muddy Waters, blues musician (1913–1983); born in "Jug's Corner".
 Eliza Winston, notable slave.

See also 
 Blackwell v. Issaquena County Board of Education, an important 1965 civil rights legal case
 National Register of Historic Places listings in Issaquena County, Mississippi
 Stack Island (Mississippi River)

References

Further reading

External links
 Sharkey-Issaquena County Library
 Sharkey-Issaquena County Health Department
 South Delta School District
 Western Line School District
 Delta National Forest
 Anderson-Tully State Wildlife Management Area
 Howard Miller Wildlife Management Area
 Shipland Wildlife Management Area
 Mahannah Wildlife Management Area

 
Mississippi counties
Mississippi counties on the Mississippi River
Mississippi placenames of Native American origin
History of slavery in Mississippi
1844 establishments in Mississippi
Populated places established in 1844
Black Belt (U.S. region)
Majority-minority counties in Mississippi